Galby may refer to:

Gaulby, a village in Leicestershire, England
Galby (surname), an English surname
Galby, nickname for the Galbatorix character in the Inheritance Cycle books and Eragon film